Guidance is the sixth studio album by American instrumental rock band Russian Circles, released on August 5, 2016 through Sargent House. The album was recorded and produced at GodCity Studio by Kurt Ballou.

Critical reception 

Guidance was met with critical acclaim. The album received an average score of 81/100 from 15 reviews on Metacritic, indicating "universal acclaim". AllMusic writer Paul Simpson praised the album's combination of heavy music and melodic ambience, saying, "Rough and explosive yet perfectly controlled, Guidance is yet another powerful statement from the heavy instrumental rock behemoths." Writing for Exclaim!, Trystan MacDonald hailed the album as "another prophetic portrait conjuring apocalyptic dimensions in the minds of those who listen". Kate Hutchinson of The Guardian wrote that "doom has never sounded so good." Jason Heller of Pitchfork said, "There's an organic and unforced feel to the latest album by Chicago-based post-rock trio Russian Circles, as if songs were allowed to grow wild rather than carefully cultivated." Brice Ezell of PopMatters wrote a slightly less glowing review, saying that the album occasionally stumbles, but that "when [it] hits, it hits hard."

Track listing

Personnel 
Russian Circles
 Brian Cook – bass
 Mike Sullivan – guitar
 Dave Turncrantz – drums

Technical personnel
 Kurt Ballou – recording, engineering, production
 Ben Chisholm – design
 Robert Cheeseman – engineering
 Carl Saff – mastering

Charts

References 

2016 albums
Russian Circles albums
Sargent House albums
Albums produced by Kurt Ballou